The provinces of Panama and some of the comarcas are divided into districts (distrito). The district are further divided into corregimientos of Panama

Bocas del Toro Province
 Bocas del Toro District
 Changuinola District
 Chiriquí Grande District
 Almirante District

Chiriquí Province
 Alanje District
 Barú District
 Boquerón District
 Boquete District
 Bugaba District
 David District
 Dolega District
 Gualaca District
 Remedios District.
 Renacimiento District
 San Félix District
 San Lorenzo District
 Tolé District
 Tierras Altas District

Coclé Province
 Aguadulce District
 Antón District
 La Pintada District
 Natá District
 Olá District
 Penonomé District

Colón Province
 Colón District
 Chagres District
 Donoso District
 Portobelo District
 Santa Isabel District
 Omar Torrijos Herrera District

Darién Province
 Chepigana District
 Pinogana District
 Santa Fe District

Herrera Province
 Chitré District
 Las Minas District
 Los Pozos District
 Ocú District
 Parita District
 Pesé District
 Santa María District

Los Santos Province
 Guararé District
 Las Tablas District
 Los Santos District
 Macaracas District
 Pedasí District
 Pocrí District
 Tonosí District

Panamá Province
 Balboa District
 Chepo District
 Chimán District
 Panamá District
 San Miguelito District
 Taboga District

Veraguas Province
 Atalaya District
 Calobre District
 Cañazas District
 La Mesa District
 Las Palmas District
 Montijo District
 Río de Jesús District
 San Francisco District
 Santa Fe District
 Santiago District
 Soná District
 Mariato District

West Panamá Province
 Arraiján District
 Capira District
 Chame District
 La Chorrera District
 San Carlos District

 
Subdivisions of Panama
Panama, Districts
Panama 2
Districts, Panama
Panama geography-related lists